Latimer Reef Light is a sparkplug lighthouse on Latimer's Reef in Fishers Island Sound. The lighthouse is located one mile northwest of East Point on Fisher's Island, Suffolk County, New York. Originally called Latemore's Reef after James Latemore.

History
On July 9, 2008, the United States Secretary of the Interior identified Latimer Reef Light Station as surplus under the National Historic Lighthouse Preservation Act of 2000. The property was described as 

The property is listed in the National Register of Historic Places (#06000635, July 19, 2006). The property must be maintained in accordance with the Secretary of Interior's Standards for Rehabilitation. Historic covenants will be incorporated into the quitclaim Deed.

The easement on the property states that "1) a 360 degree arc of visibility easement; 2) an easement an unrestricted right of accessing, to and across the Property to maintain, operate, service, repair and install equipment as necessary to support its ATON mission; 3) the unrestricted right to relocate or add any aid to navigation or communications towers and equipment (along with necessary right or egress/ingress), or make any changes on any portion of the Property as may be necessary for navigation/public safety purposes; and 4) an easement to the USCG for the purpose of an electronically, 80 decibel fog signal and flashing red light.

The Archives Center at the Smithsonian National Museum of American History has a collection (#1055) of souvenir postcards of lighthouses and has digitized 272 of these and made them available online. These include postcards of Latimer Reef Light  with links to customized nautical charts provided by National Oceanographic and Atmospheric Administration.

References

External links
 Long Island Lighthouses article
 Lighthouse Friends site

Lighthouses completed in 1884
Houses completed in 1884
Lighthouses on the National Register of Historic Places in New York (state)
Lighthouses in Suffolk County, New York
National Register of Historic Places in Suffolk County, New York
1884 establishments in New York (state)